Hugo López Martínez (born 15 May 1988) is a Spanish professional footballer who plays as a midfielder for Dhofar Club.

Football career
López was born in Gijón, Asturias. While playing for his high school of Colegio de la Inmaculada (Gijón), he was recruited by La Liga club FC Barcelona at the age of 14, remaining with the youth academy for five years. He began his senior career in the fourth division with UD Almería B, then moved to the third with another reserve team, Sporting de Gijón B.

For 2009–10, López returned to the fourth level and Almería's reserves, and also competed in that tier in the following season, with SD Noja. In the 2011 off-season he moved abroad and signed a one-year contract with Atlético Clube de Portugal, freshly promoted to division two.

López played his first official match with the Lisbon club in a League Cup 1–1 away draw against Portimonense SC, on 7 August 2011. He left at the end of the campaign, going on to compete in quick succession in Bulgaria, Israel, Cyprus, Mexico and Oman.

On 23 July 2019, López returned to Dhofar Club.

Club statistics

References

External links

1988 births
Living people
Footballers from Gijón
Spanish footballers
Association football midfielders
Segunda División B players
Tercera División players
Colegio de la Inmaculada (Gijón) footballers
UD Almería B players
Sporting de Gijón B players
Liga Portugal 2 players
Atlético Clube de Portugal players
First Professional Football League (Bulgaria) players
PFC Slavia Sofia players
Israeli Premier League players
Hapoel Nir Ramat HaSharon F.C. players
Hapoel Kfar Saba F.C. players
Cypriot First Division players
Enosis Neon Paralimni FC players
Apollon Limassol FC players
Club Celaya footballers
Dhofar Club players
UAE First Division League players
Al Hamriyah Club players
Saudi First Division League players
Al-Jabalain FC players
Spanish expatriate footballers
Expatriate footballers in Portugal
Expatriate footballers in Bulgaria
Expatriate footballers in Israel
Expatriate footballers in Cyprus
Expatriate footballers in Mexico
Expatriate footballers in Oman
Expatriate footballers in the United Arab Emirates
Expatriate footballers in Saudi Arabia
Spanish expatriate sportspeople in Israel
Spanish expatriate sportspeople in Cyprus
Spanish expatriate sportspeople in Mexico
Spanish expatriate sportspeople in Saudi Arabia
Colegio de la Inmaculada (Gijón) alumni